Sialega Malaetasi Mauga Togafau (June 4, 1946 - March 9, 2007) was an American Samoan politician, judge, and lawyer. He was a member of the American Samoa House of Representatives, American Samoa's first Administrative Law Judge, and ultimately Attorney General.

Biography
Togafau was born on June 4, 1946 to Femalua'i Palepoi Mauga Sialo'i. His grandparents Posiulai Mamea of the Maluia family in Nuuuli and Togafau Sefulu Aumoeualogo of Amouli raised him in Nu'uuli, American Samoa.

Given the name Steve Mauga at birth, Malaetasi was the third of 11 children born to Femalua'i. Malaetasi was baptized by his grandparents Posiulai and Togafau at the Nuuuli Congregational Christian Church, officiated by the Reverend Elder Tanielu Aasa's tenure as pastor of Nuuuli EFKS. His mother's father, Paramont Chief Mauga Palepoi anointed him as *Malaetasi."

Togafau was an ordained Deacon of the Congregational Christian Church of American Samoa and held this sacred role until his death in 2007. He was an active member of the Nuuuli Congregational Christian Church.

Togafau served as a member of the American Samoa House of Representatives from 1983 to 1986. He resigned in 1986 to take up an appointment as a Judge of the District Court of American Samoa, and served in that role until he was appointed as Attorney-General in the administration of Governor A. P. Lutali in 1993. He was elected to the House of Representatives again in the Ituau District in 1996. In March 2000 he was appointed as American Samoa's first Administrative Law Judge, subsequently surrendering his seat in the House to take up the role. In January 2005 he was again appointed Attorney-General by Governor Togiola Tulafono. In 2006 he was diagnosed with colon cancer and subsequently travelled to Honolulu for medical treatment. He died of complications in March 2007.

Prior to returning to American Samoa, Togafau was associated with the Church of Jesus Christ of Latter-day Saints, and married Oreta Mapu in the LDS Temple in Laie in 1977. A memorial service was held in the Kalihi, Hawaii chapel of the LDS Church, West Honolulu Stake. [Obituary, Honolulu Advertiser]. His final services were held at the Nuuuli Congregational Christian Church conducted by Rev. Dr. Elia Titimaea Taase.

Marriage
Togafau married Dr. Oreta S. Mapu, from the villages of Aua and Aoa, on December 10, 1977 in Laie, Hawaii.

Public service
Togafau held the chiefly title of Afioga ile Taumafaalofi (SIALEGA title bestowed on November 27, 2003). He was bestowed this ancient title of Nuuuli, that was held by his maternal uncle, Palepoi Mauga Jr. 
 Atilavea --- a minor chiefly title of Atilave'a was conferred in 1993 from his grandmother Posiulai's Maluia Family. As Atilavea, Togafau was responsible for organizing and supporting activities for the young men of the Maluia clan as well as the village in general. Togafau actively participated in the Nuuuli Aumaga, young untitled men of Nuuuli, with the coordinating of training for the yearly long boat regatta, or tuuga Fautasi.

Professional career
 Assistant Public Defender - American Samoa High High Court September - December, 1974
 Legal Cousel - American Samoa Delegates-at-Large Office, Washington DC (1975–1978)
 Legislative Cousel - American Samoa Representative Office, U.S Congress(1979–1982)

Education
 Peru State University; Graduate of 1971; Awarded Bachelor Science in Geography With Honors
 California Western University; Graduate of 1974; Awarded Juris Doctor
 Leone High School; Graduate of 1966; First School Valedictorian.

References

1946 births
2007 deaths
American Samoan Attorneys General
Deaths from cancer in Hawaii
American Samoan judges
Alliant International University alumni
Members of the American Samoa House of Representatives
American Samoan Congregationalists
Deaths from colorectal cancer
People from Nu'uuli
20th-century American judges
20th-century American politicians